Vienna Blood (German: Wiener Blut) is a 1942 German operetta film, based on the 1899 operetta of the same name.  With box-office takings of seven million Reichsmarks, it was one of the most financially successful films of the Nazi era.

Plot 

The young Count Georg Wolkersheim (Willy Fritsch) is sent to the Congress of Vienna (1814-1815) to represent the interests of his country, Reuss-Schleiz-Greiz.  Tensions arise between the count, his wife Melanie (Maria Holst), and their two chamberlains (Hans Moser and Theo Lingen), and when the four of them attend a court ball, Melanie leaves Georg, assumes the identity of a famous actress, and attracts the affections of Crown Prince Ludwig of Bavaria (Fred Liewehr).  Georg quits the ball and returns to his lodgings to wait for his wife.  Meanwhile, the two servants plot to further inflame Georg's jealousy by posing as Ludwig to commission a portrait of Melanie from the famous artist Moritz Daffinger (Egon von Jordan).  The next day, however, Georg and Daffinger expose the servants' ruse, Ludwig reveals to Melanie that he has discovered her true identity, and all is forgiven.

Release history 

The film had its national premieres on 2 April 1942 in Vienna and on 17 April 1942 in Berlin, and was first aired on television on the GDR's Deutscher Fernsehfunk on 15 October 1962.  Its American premiere, under the title Vienna Blood, was on 21 March 1951 in New York City.  Studiocanal released a DVD version on 25 July 2008.  Running times of the various releases vary from 103 to 111 minutes.

Awards 

The Reich's Film Review Office officially recognized Wiener Blut as "of particular artistic value" and "culturally valuable".  The film also received an award at the 10th Venice International Film Festival.

Cast
 Willy Fritsch as Graf Georg Wolkersheim  
 Maria Holst as Gräfin Melanie Wolkersheim  
 Hans Moser as Knöpfel 
 Theo Lingen as Jean 
 Dorit Kreysler as Liesl Stadler  
 Fred Liewehr as Crown-Prince Ludwig von Bayern 
 Hedwig Bleibtreu as Fürstin Auersbach 
 Klaramaria Skala as Ulli  
 Paul Henckels as Fürst Ypsheim  
 Ernst Fritz Fürbringer as Metternich  
 Egon von Jordan as Daffinger 
 Fritz Imhoff as Urwiener  
 Maria Reining as Kammersängerin 
 Lea Piltti as Singer 
 Wilma Tatzel as Anni 
 Wiener Philharmoniker as Group cast appearance 
 Karl Blühm 
 Julius Karsten

References

External links

Bibliography 
 Hake, Sabine. Popular Cinema of the Third Reich. University of Texas Press, 2001.

1942 films
1942 musical comedy films
1940s historical comedy films
German musical comedy films
Films of Nazi Germany
1940s German-language films
Operetta films
Films based on operettas
German black-and-white films
Films set in Vienna
Films set in the 1810s
Wiener Film
Cultural depictions of Klemens von Metternich
Films directed by Willi Forst
German historical comedy films
1940s historical musical films
German historical musical films
Films set in the Austrian Empire